Rinki Sethi is an American technology executive who has held Chief Information Security Officer and Vice President of Information Security roles at several large companies.

Education 
Sethi attended Capella University from 2006 to 2007 and completed a Master's Degree in Information Security, and completed a Bachelors Degree in Computer Science Engineering from UC Davis in 2004.

Career 
Sethi worked at Intuit as a Director of Product Security from 2012-2015. She worked as VP, Security Operations at Palo Alto Networks from 2015-2018. She worked at IBM from October 2018 to April 2019 as the Vice President of Information Security. Sethi served as Chief Information Security Officer at Rubrik from April 2019 to September 2020. She was an Information Security Executive at IBM from 2018 to 2019.

She was vice president and Chief Information Security Officer at Twitter Inc. Sethi joined Twitter after the 2020 Twitter bitcoin scam breach which compromised accounts of then-presidential candidate Joe Biden, Kim Kardashian, Elon Musk and Microsoft co-founder Bill Gates. 

She has also worked with companies like Walmart, Intuit, Ebay and others as a CISO and security expert.

Sethi also serves as an advisor to several startups, including LevelOps, Authomize, and Cybersecurity organizations, including Women in Cybersecurity. Sethi was named to the board of directors of Forge Rock in August 2021.

References 

Year of birth missing (living people)
Living people
American computer specialists
21st-century American businesspeople
Corporate executives
Businesspeople from San Francisco
Twitter, Inc. people
University of California, Davis alumni